Maple Grove Road Rural Historic District is a national historic district located in Bloomington Township and Richland Township, Monroe County, Indiana.  The district encompasses 69 contributing buildings, 7 contributing sites, 8 contributing structures, and 30 contributing objects in a rural area near Bloomington.  The district developed between about 1828 and 1950, and include notable examples of Gothic Revival and Greek Revival style architecture.  The contributing elements are located on 12 farmsteads.  Located in the district is the separately listed Daniel Stout House.

It was listed on the National Register of Historic Places in 1998.

References

Historic districts on the National Register of Historic Places in Indiana
Gothic Revival architecture in Indiana
Greek Revival architecture in Indiana
Buildings and structures in Monroe County, Indiana
Historic districts in Monroe County, Indiana
National Register of Historic Places in Monroe County, Indiana